LeRoy G. Bernstein (born May 16, 1930), was an American politician who was a member of the North Dakota House of Representatives. He served from 1989 to 2006. He is a former president of a moving company and a veteran of the Korean War. He was Speaker of the North Dakota House of Representatives from 2001 to 2003.

References

1930 births
Living people
Speakers of the North Dakota House of Representatives
Republican Party members of the North Dakota House of Representatives
Politicians from Minneapolis
Politicians from Fargo, North Dakota
United States Army personnel of the Korean War
United States Army soldiers